Francis of Bourbon or François de Bourbon, (In a date range from January 7, 1470 to December 31, 1470 – 30 October 1495), was the Count of Vendôme and a French prince du sang.

Life
Francis was the son of John VIII de Bourbon, Count of Vendôme and Isabelle de Beauvau, the daughter of Louis de Beauvau, Marshal of Provence. As a legitimate member of the Capetian dynasty, he ranked in France as a prince du sang. Francis was seven, when his father died and he succeeded as count of Vendôme. During his minority, his estates were administered by his brother in law, Louis of Joyeuse.

Marriage
In 1487, Francis married Marie of Luxembourg, the elder daughter and principal heiress of Peter II of Luxembourg, Count of Saint-Pol and Soissons, and Margaret of Savoy. She brought great estates as her dowry, including the countships of Saint-Pol and Soissons in Picardy, as well as the Château de Condé.

Francis and Marie had:
Charles de Bourbon (1489–1537), who later became Duke of Vendôme.
Jacques de Bourbon (1490–1491), died young
Francis de Bourbon (1491–1545), Count of Saint Pol and Chaumont, and Duke of Estouteville
Louis de Bourbon (1493–1557), Archbishop of Sens
Antoinette de Bourbon (1493–1583), married Claude, Duke of Guise
Louise de Bourbon (1495–1575), Abbess of Fontevraud

By Isabeau de Grigny, Francis had an illegitimate son:
 Jacques de Bourbon

Francis de Bourbon died at the age of 25 in Vercelli, Italy, and was succeeded by his eldest son, Charles IV de Bourbon. His widow Marie administered the family's estates during Charles' minority.

Ancestors

References

Sources

1470 births
1495 deaths
People from Vendôme
House of Bourbon
Counts of Vendôme
Counts of Soissons